The 1964–65 Liga Leumit season saw Hakoah Ramat Gan crowned champions for the first time in their history, beating Hapoel Petah Tikva to the title on goal difference. Israel Ashkenazi (Maccabi Jaffa) and Zaki Mizrahi (Bnei Yehuda) were the joint top scorers with 18 goals each.

Maccabi Haifa and Hapoel Tiberias were relegated to Liga Alef.

Final table

Results

References
Israel - List of final tables RSSSF
The First Crown Paz, Israel and Koffmann Tzvi (June 1965), Tel Aviv, Pirsumei Sport 

Liga Leumit seasons
Israel
1964–65 in Israeli football leagues